This list of the Paleozoic life of Arizona contains the various prehistoric life-forms whose fossilized remains have been reported from within the US state of Arizona and are between 538.8 and 252.17 million years of age.

A

 †Acandylacanthus
 †Acanthopecten
 †Acanthopecten coloradoensis
 †Achistrum
 †Achistrum frizzelli
 †Aclisina – tentative report
 †Aclisina bisulcata – type locality for species
 †Acrocephalops
 †Adetognathus
 †Adetognathus gigantus
 †Adetognathus lautus
 †Aglaocrinus
 †Aglaocrinus konecnyorum – type locality for species
 †Aglaocrinus nacoensis – type locality for species
 †Aglaoglypta
 †Aglaoglypta maera
 †Alisporites
 †Alloiopteris
 †Alloiopteris sternbergii
 †Alloipteris
 †Alloipteris sternbergii
 †Allorisma – tentative report
 †Allorisma juveniles – informal
 †Alokistocare
 †Altudoceras
 †Altudoceras mckeei – type locality for species
 †Alula
 †Alula gilberti
 †Ambocoelia
 †Amelacanthus
 †Ameura
 †Amphipora
 †Amphiscapha
 †Amphiscapha proxima
 †Amphiscapha subrugosa
 †Amplexizaphrentis
 †Anisopyge
 †Anisopyge inornata
   †Annularia
 †Annularia asteris
 †Annularia mucronata
 †Annularia stellata
 †Anomphalus
 †Anoria
 †Antagmus
 †Anthracospirifer
 †Anthracospirifer leidyi
 †Anthracospirifer newberryi
 †Anthracospirifer occiduus
 †Anthracospirifer opimus – or unidentified comparable form
 †Anthracospirifer tanoensis
 †Antiquatonia
 †Antiquatonia portlockianus
 †Apachella – type locality for genus
 †Apachella arizonensis – type locality for species
 †Apachella franciscana – type locality for species
 †Apachella mulensis
 †Apachella prodontia
 †Apachella translirata
 †Apachella turbiniformis – type locality for species
 †Aphyllopteris
 †Arasta
 †Arasta torquata
 †Arastra – type locality for genus
 †Arastra torquata – type locality for species
   †Archaeocidaris
  †Archimedes
 †Archimedes confertus
 †Archimedes intermedius
 †Archimedes invaginatus
 †Archimedes lativolvis
 †Archimedes proutanus
 †Archimedes terebriformis
 †Arcochiton
 †Arcochiton richardsoni
 †Arizonella – type locality for genus
 †Arizonella allecta – type locality for species
 †Arizonerpeton – type locality for genus
 †Arizonerpeton wellsi – type locality for species
 †Astartella
 †Astartella subquadrata
 †Asterophyllites
 †Asterophyllites equisetiformis
 †Asterophyllites grandis
 †Athyris
 †Atribonium
 †Atribonium arizonensis
 †Aulametacoceras – type locality for genus
 †Aulametacoceras mckeei – type locality for species
  †Aulopora
  †Aviculopecten
 †Aviculopecten bellatulus – type locality for species
 †Aviculopecten girtyi – or unidentified comparable form
 †Aviculopecten gravidus
 †Aviculopecten kaibabensis – type locality for species
 †Aviculopinna
 †Aviculopinna peracuta – tentative report

B

 †Bakevellia
 †Bakevellia prora – type locality for species
 †Bakevellia sulcata
 †Batostomella
 †Batostomella nitidula
 †Batostomella spinulosa
 †Batostromella
 †Baxtonia
 †Baxtonia arizonensis
 †Baylea
 †Baylea coheni – type locality for species
 †Bellaclathrus – type locality for genus
 †Bellaclathrus spinosus – type locality for species
  †Bellerophon
 †Bellerophon deflectus – type locality for species
 †Bellerophon huecoensis
 †Bellerophon parvicristus
 †Bellerophon sublaevis
 †Biarmeaspira
 †Biarmeaspira multilineata
 †Bicorbis – type locality for genus
 †Bicorbis arizonica – type locality for species
 †Bolaspis
 †Bolaspis aemula
 †Brachyphyllum
 †Brachyphyllum arizonicum – type locality for species
 †Brachyphyllum arizonieum – type locality for species
 †Brachyphyllum tenue – type locality for species
 †Brachythyris
 †Brachythyris chesterensis
 †Brachythyris peculiaris
 †Bradyospira – type locality for genus
 †Bradyospira johnsensis – type locality for species
 †Bransonella
 †Bransonella lingulata – tentative report
 †Bransonella nebraskensis – tentative report
 †Bransonella tribula – type locality for species
 †Brongniartites – tentative report
 †Brongniartites aliena – type locality for species
 †Brongniartites yakiensis – type locality for species
 †Bucanopsis
 †Buxtonia
 †Buxtonia arizonensis
 †Buxtonia arkansansus
 †Buxtonia arkansanus

C

  †Calamites
 †Calamites cisti
 †Calamites cistiiformis
 †Callipteris
 †Callipteris arizonae – type locality for species
 †Callipteris C. flabellifera – or unidentified comparable form
 †Callipteris conferta
 †Callipteris flabellifera
 †Callipteris raymondi
 †Camarotechia
 †Camarotechia metallica
 †Camarotoechia
 †Camarotoechia metallica
 †Camarotoechia mutata
 †Camarotoechia purduei
  †Caninia – tentative report
 †Caninia arcuata
 †Carpolithus
 †Chilotrypa – tentative report
 †Chonetes
 †Chonetes okahomensis
 †Chonetes oklahomensis
 †Cibecuia – type locality for genus
 †Cibecuia cedarensis – type locality for species
 †Clavaspidella
 †Clavaspidella kanabensis
  †Cleiothyridina
 †Cleiothyridina orbicularis
 †Cliothyridina
 †Cliothyridina sublamellosa
 †Cloithyridina
 †Cloithyridina hirsuta
 †Complexisporites
  †Composita
 †Composita deltoides
 †Composita gibbosa
 †Composita humilis
 †Composita laevis
 †Composita lewisensis
 †Composita mexicana
 †Composita ovata
 †Composita ozarkana
 †Composita subtilia
 †Composita subtilita
 †Composita trinuclea
 †Conetes
 †Conetes oklahomensis
 †Congeriomorpha – type locality for genus
 †Congeriomorpha andrusovi – type locality for species
 †Conularia
 †Conularia kaibabensis – type locality for species
 †Converrucosisporites
 †Convolutispora
  †Cooksonia – or unidentified comparable form
 †Cooksonia hemisphaerica
  †Cordaites
 †Cordaites principalis
 †Costellarina
 †Costellarina carlstroemi
 †Craenena
 †Cristatisporites
 †Cromyocrinus – tentative report
 †Crurithyris
 †Crurithyris planoconvexa
 †Cupularostrum
 †Cupularostrum saxatilis
 †Cupularostrum saxitalis
 †Cupulo – or unidentified comparable form
 †Cupulo rostrum
 †Cyclocarpon
 †Cyclocarpon angelicum – type locality for species
 †Cycloceras
 †Cycloceras randolphensis
  †Cyclopteris
 †Cyclopteris orbicularis
 †Cyclozyga
 †Cyclozyga micra
 †Cylindritopsis
 †Cylindritopsis insolitus – type locality for species
 †Cymatochiton – tentative report
 †Cymatochiton kaibabensis – type locality for species
 †Cyperites
  †Cyrtospirifer
 †Cyrtospirifer kindlei
 †Cyrtospirifer whitneyi
 †Cystodictya

D

 †Daubreeia
 †Delaria
 †Delaria sevilloidia – type locality for species
 †Delaria snowi
 †Delocrinus
 †Deltodus
 †Deltodus angularis
 †Deltodus mercurei
 †Deltodus sublaevis
 †Deltopecten
 †Deltopecten monroensis
 †Deltopecten tahlequahensis
 †Derbyia
 †Derbyia crassa
 †Derbyia robusta – or unidentified comparable form
 †Diablodontus – type locality for genus
 †Diablodontus michaeledmundi – type locality for species
 †Diaphragmus
 †Diaphragmus fasciculatus
 †Dichotrypa
 †Dichotrypa elegans
 †Dicromyocrinus
 †Dicromyocrinus beusi – type locality for species
 †Dicromyocrinus carrizoensis – type locality for species
 †Dictyoclostus
 †Dictyoclostus arcuatus
 †Dictyonina
 †Dielasma
 †Dielasma burlingtonensis
 †Dielasma formosum
 †Dielasma illinoisense
 †Dielasma shumardanum
 †Dielasma sinuatum
 †Dielasmoides
 †Dielasmoides bisinuatus
 †Disphyllum
 †Ditomopyge
 †Donaldina
 †Donaldospira
 †Donaldospira geminocarinata – type locality for species
 †Dyoros
 †Dyoros kaibabensis
 †Dyoros subliratus

E

 †Echinaria
 †Echinaria semipunctata
 †Echinauris
 †Echinauris newberryi
 †Echinauris subhorrida
 †Echinoconchus
 †Echinoconchus biseriatus
 †Echinoconchus elegans
 †Echinoconchus rodeoensis
 †Echinocrinus
 †Echinocrinus dininnii – or unidentified related form
 †Echinocrinus trudifer
 †Edmondia
 †Edmondia crassa
 †Edmondia fountainensis
 †Edmondia genevievensis
 †Edmondia gibbosa – or unidentified comparable form
 †Eirmocrinus
 †Eirmocrinus brewi – type locality for species
 †Elasmonema
 †Elfridia – type locality for genus
 †Elfridia bulbidens – type locality for species
   †Elrathia
 †Eltovaria
 †Eltovaria bursiformis – type locality for species
 †Endelocrinus
 †Endosporites
 †Ensiferites
 †Ensiferites brandenburgi – type locality for species
 †Eoastarte
 †Eoastarte subcircularis
 Eocaudina
 †Eocaudina marginata
 †Eocrinus
 †Eomarginifera
 †Eomarginifera adairensis
 †Eridopora
 †Eridopora macrostoma
 †Eridopora occidentalis
 †Euconoapira
 †Euconospira
 †Euconospira cryptolirata – type locality for species
 †Euconospira missouriensis – or unidentified comparable form
 †Eumetria
 †Eumetria vera
 †Eumetria verneuilana
  †Euomphalus
 †Euomphalus cornudanus
 †Euomphalus kaibabensis – type locality for species
 †Euomphalus similis
 †Euomphalus spergenense
 †Euomphalus subplanus
 †Euomphalus utahensis
 †Euphemites
 †Euphemites aequisulcatus – type locality for species
 †Euphemites lentiformus
 †Euphemitopsis
 †Euphemitopsis multinodosa
 †Euphemitopsis subpapillosa

F

 †Fenestella
 †Fenestella morrowensis
 †Fenestella multispinosa
 †Fistulipora
 †Flexaria
 †Florinites
 †Floweria
 †Floweria chemungensis
 †Floweria prava
 †Frnestella
 †Frnestella serratula
 †Frnestella tenax
  †Fusulina
 †Fusulina socorroensis

G

 †Gamphalosia
 †Gingkophytopsis
 †Girtyella
 †Girtyella brevilobata
 †Girtyella indianensis
 †Girtypora
 †Girtypora maculata – type locality for species
 †Girtyspira
 †Glabrocingulum
 †Glabrocingulum coronatum – type locality for species
 †Glabrocingulum gibber – type locality for species
 †Glabrocingulum laeviliratum – type locality for species
  †Glikmanius
 †Glikmanius myachkovensis
 †Glikmanius occidentalis
 †Globular
 †Globular eocrinoid – tentative report
 †Glossopleura
 †Glyphaspis
 †Glyphaspis tecta
 †Glyptopora
 †Glyptospira – type locality for genus
 †Glyptospira cristulata – type locality for species
 †Glyptospira huecoensis
 †Glyptotomaria
  †Gnathorhiza – or unidentified comparable form
 †Gnathorhiza serrata
 †Gomphostrobus
 †Gomphostrobus bifidus
 †Gomphostrobus G. bifidus – or unidentified comparable form
 †Goniasma
 †Goniasma terebra
 †Goniophora
 †Goniophora cristata – type locality for species
 †Grammatodon
 †Grammatodon politus
 †Gymnospermous
 †Gypidula

H

 †Haplistion
 †Haplistion armstrongi
 †Hastimima – tentative report
 †Hedeia
 †Heslerodus
 †Heslerodus divergens
  †Hexagonaria
 †Hexagonaria minuta
 †Hexagonaria occidens
 †Hexagonaria palmeri
 †Hostimella
 †Hostimella hostimensis
 †Hustedia
  †Hyolithes

I

 †Ianthinopsis
 †Icriodus
 †Icriodus brevis
 †Idiognathodus
 †Idiognathodus delicatus
 †Idiognathodus humerus
 †Indospirifer
 †Indospirifer orestes
 †Iowaphyllum
 †Iowaphyllum johanni
 †Iowaphyllum nisbeti

J

 †Janeia

K

 †Kaibabella – type locality for genus
 †Kaibabella curvilenata – type locality for species
 †Kaibabvenator – type locality for genus
 †Kaibabvenator swiftae – type locality for species
 †Kingopora
 †Kingopora portalensis
 †Kinishbia – type locality for genus
 †Kinishbia nodosa – type locality for species
 †Knorria
 †Knoxisporites
 †Kochina – tentative report
 †Kochina angustata
   †Kootenia
 †Kootenia mckeei
 †Kutorginella
 †Kutorginella meridionalis

L

 †Laevigatosporites
 †Lagarodus
 †Lagarodus angustus
 †Leioproductus
 †Leioproductus plicatus
 †Lepetopsis – or unidentified comparable form
  †Lepidodendron
 †Lepidodendron aculeatum
 †Lepidodendron mannabachense
 †Lepidodendron volkmannianum
 †Lepidostrobophyllum
 †Lepidostrobus
 †Lepidostrobus ornatus – or unidentified comparable form
 †Leptalosia
 †Leptodesma
 †Leptodesma carboniferum
 †Leptodesma robustum
 †Levidentalium
 †Lingula
  †Lingulella
 †Lingulella kanabensis
 †Lingulella zetus
 †Linoproductus
 †Linoproductus altonensis
 †Linoproductus gallatinensis
 †Linoproductus nodosus
 †Linoproductus ovatus
 †Linoproductus prattenianus
 †Linoproductus pumilis
 †Liroceras
 †Lissochonetes
 †Lophamplexus – tentative report
 †Lophophyllum – report made of unidentified related form or using admittedly obsolete nomenclature

M

 †Manzanella
 †Manzanella cryptodentata
 †Marginifera – tentative report
 †Meekella
 †Meekella occidentalis – type locality for species
 †Meekopinna
 †Meekopinna sagitta – type locality for species
 †Meekopora
 †Meekopora parilis
 †Meekospira
 †Meekospira knighti – type locality for species
 †Meekospira sulcata – type locality for species
 †Megactenopetalus – type locality for genus
 †Megactenopetalus kaibabanus – type locality for species
  †Metacoceras
 †Metacoceras bowmani – type locality for species
 †Metacoceras unklesbayi – type locality for species
 †Metacromyocrinus
 †Metacromyocrinus holdenvillensis – or unidentified comparable form
 †Michelina
 †Microdoma
 †Microreticulatisporites
  †Modiolus
 †Modiolus fountainensis
 †Modiolus illinoiensis
 †Mourlonia – tentative report
 †Mourlonia cancellata – type locality for species
 †Multithecopora – tentative report
 †Murchisonia
 †Myalina
 †Myalina adunca – type locality for species
 †Myalina angulata
 †Myalina congeneris
 †Myalina monroensis
 †Myalina nacoensis – type locality for species
 †Myoconcha

N

 †Nanoskalme – type locality for genus
 †Nanoskalme natans – type locality for species
  †Naticopsis
 †Naticopsis apachensis – type locality for species
 †Naticopsis kaibabensis – type locality for species
 †Naticopsis permica – type locality for species
 †Naticopsis waterlooensis
 †Neosaivodus – type locality for genus
 †Neosaivodus flagstaffensis – type locality for species
  †Neospirifer – tentative report
 †Neospirifer dunbari
 †Neuropteridium – tentative report
  †Neuropteris
 †Neuropteris heterophylla
 †Neuropteris missouriensis
 †Neuropteris scheuchzeri
 †Nisusia
 †Nisusia kanabensis
 †Nisusia noblei
 †Novoameura
 †Novoameura mckeei – type locality for species
  Nucula
 †Nucula illinoisensis
 †Nucula platynotus
 †Nucula randolphensis
 Nuculana
 †Nuculana curta
 †Nuculavus
 †Nuculavus levatiformis
 †Nuculopsis

O

 †Odontopteris
 †Odontopteris schlotheimii
 †Odontopteris schlotheimiii
  †Olenellus
 †Omphalotrochus
 †Omphalotrochus cochisensis
 †Omphalotrochus hessensis
  †Ophiderpeton
 †Ophiderpeton swisshelmense – type locality for species
 †Orbiculoidea
 †Orbiculoidea meekana
 †Orbiculoidea missouriensis – or unidentified comparable form
 †Oriocrassatella
  †Orodus
  †Orthacanthus
 †Orthacanthus donnelljohnsi – type locality for species
 †Orthonema
 †Orthonema striatonodosum – type locality for species
 †Orthonychia
 †Orthonychia striatulus
 †Orthotetes
 †Orthotetes kaskaskiensis
 †Orthotetes keokuk
 †Orthotetes subglobosus
 †Ozawainella – tentative report
 †Ozawainella inflata

P

 †Pachyaspis
 †Pachyphyllum
 †Pachyphyllum woodmani
  †Pagiophyllum
 †Pagiophyllum dubium – type locality for species
 †Paladin
 †Palaeocapulus
 †Palaeocapulus acutirostre
 †Palaeolima
 †Palaeolima chesterensis
 †Palaeolima retifera – or unidentified comparable form
 †Palaeoneilo
 †Palaeostachya
 †Palaeostylus
 †Palaeostylus giganticus – type locality for species
 †Paleotaxites – type locality for genus
 †Paleotaxites praecursor – type locality for species
 †Paleyoldia
 †Paleyoldia pumilis
 †Palmatolepis
 †Palmatolepis triangularis
 †Paraconularia
 †Paraconularia kohli – type locality for species
 †Paradelocrinus
 †Paradelocrinus nederi
 †Parajuresania
 †Parajuresania nebrascensis
 †Parallelodon
 †Parallelodon anaklastum – type locality for species
 †Parallelodon illinoisensis
 †Parallelodon minima
 †Paraparchites
 †Parapenascoceras
 †Parapenascoceras rotundatum
 †Parapenascoceras sanandreasense – or unidentified comparable form
 †Parasmithiphyllum
 †Parasmithiphyllum breviseptatum
 †Parehmania
 †Parehmania nitida
 †Paterina
 †Paterina crenistria
 †Paurorhyncha
 †Paurorhyncha cooperi
 †Paurorhyncha endlichi
  †Pecopteris
 †Pecopteris aspera – or unidentified comparable form
 †Pecopteris cyathea
 †Pecopteris lamuriana
 †Penascoceras
 †Penascoceras bradyi – type locality for species
 †Peneckiella
 †Peniculauris
 †Peniculauris bassi
 †Peniculauris ivesi
  †Pentremites
 †Permophorus
 †Permophorus albequus
 †Permophorus mexicanus – or unidentified comparable form
 †Permophorus subcostatus – tentative report
 †Pernotrochus – type locality for genus
 †Pernotrochus arizonensis – type locality for species
 †Perrinites
 †Perrinites hilli
  †Petalodus
 †Petalodus ohioensis
 †Petrodus
 †Petrodus patelliformis
 †Phacellophyllum
 †Phestia
 †Phestia perumbonata
 †Phillipsia
    †Phlegethontia
 †Phlegethontia phanerhapha – type locality for species
 †Phricodothyris
 †Physonemus
  †Pinna
 †Pityosporites
 †Plagioglypta
 †Planotectus – tentative report
   †Platyceras
 †Platyworthenia
 †Platyworthenia delicata
 †Polidevcia
 †Polidevcia obesa
  †Polygnathus
 †Polygnathus angustidiscus
 †Polygnathus normalis
 †Polypora
 †Polypora cestriensis
 †Polypora spinulifera
 †Pontisia
 †Popanoceras – report made of unidentified related form or using admittedly obsolete nomenclature
 †Porostictia
 †Porostictia perchaensis
 †Potonieisporites
 †Prodentalium
 †Prodentalium canna
 †Prodiozoptyxis
 †Productus
 †Productus indianensis
 †Productus inflatus
 †Productus marginicinctus
 †Productus scitulus
 †Promytilus
 †Promytilus retusus – type locality for species
 †Protoconchioides
 †Protoconchioides hermitensis – type locality for species
 †Protohaploxypinus
 †Pseudoatrypa
 †Pseudoatrypa devoniana
 †Pseudoconocardium
 †Pseudodielasma – tentative report
 †Pseudogastrioceras – tentative report
 †Pseudomonotis
 †Pseudomonotis likharevi – or unidentified comparable form
 †Pseudorthoceras
 †Pseudorthoceras knoxense
 †Pseudozygopleura
 †Pseudozygopleura knighti – type locality for species
 †Psygmophyllum
 †Ptarmigania
 †Pterinopecten
 †Ptyonius – tentative report
 †Ptyonius olisthmonaias – type locality for species
 †Pugnoides
 †Pugnoides ottumwa
 †Pulchratia – tentative report
 †Pulchratia picuris
 †Punctatisporites
 †Punctospirifer
 †Punctospirifer subtextus
 †Punctospirifer transversus

R

 †Raistrickia
 †Rectifenestella
 †Rectifenestella tenax
 †Reticularia
 †Reticularia gonionota
 †Reticularia setigera
 †Reticularina
 †Retispira
 †Retispira modesta
 †Retispira monronensis
 †Retispira undulata – type locality for species
 †Rhabdomeson
 †Rhineoderma
 †Rhineoderma dinglensis
 †Rhipidomella
 †Rhipidomella burlingtonensis
 †Rhipidomella dubia
 †Rhipidomella thiemei
 †Rhizomaspora
 †Rhombopora
 †Rhombopora decipiens
 †Rhombopora persimilis
 †Rhombopora tenuirama
 †Rhombopora wortheni
 †Rhomopora
 †Rhynchopora
 †Rhynchopora illinoisensis
 †Rimmyjimina – type locality for genus
 †Rimmyjimina arcula – type locality for species
 †Rivularites
 †Rivularites permiensis – type locality for species
 †Rota
 †Rota martini
 †Rotiphyllum
 †Rugatia
 †Rugatia occidentalis
 †Rugosa

S

 †Saivodus
 †Sallya – tentative report
 †Sallya lirata – type locality for species
 †Sanguinolites
 †Scaphellina – type locality for genus
 †Scaphellina concinna – type locality for species
 †Schizodus
 †Schizodus amplus
 †Schizodus batesvillensis
 †Schizodus brannerianus
 †Schizodus canalis
 †Schizodus chesterensis
 †Schizodus drpressus
 †Schizodus supaiensis – type locality for species
 †Schizodus texanus
 †Schizophoria
 †Schizophoria altirostris
 †Schizophoria australis
 †Schopfipollenites
 †Scoyenia
 †Scoyenia gracilis – type locality for species
 †Selenimyalina
 †Septimyalina
 †Septopora
 †Septopora cestriensis
 †Septopora decipiens
 †Septopora subquadrans
  Serpula
 †Serpula helicalis – type locality for species
 †Shansiella
 †Shansiella beckwithana – or unidentified comparable form
 †Shark
 †Shark teeth
 †Smithiphyllum
 †Smithiphyllum martinense
  Solemya
 †Solemya parallella
 †Soleniscus
 †Soleniscus philipi – type locality for species
 †Solenomorpha – report made of unidentified related form or using admittedly obsolete nomenclature
 †Solenopleura
 †Solenopleurella
 †Solenopleurella diligens
 †Solenopleurella erosa
 †Solenopleurella porcata
 †Spathognathodus
 †Spathognathodus coloradoensis
 †Speriferina
 †Speriferina spinosa
  †Sphenophyllum
 †Sphenophyllum gilmorei – type locality for species
 †Sphenophyllum oblongifolium
  †Sphenopteris
 †Sphenopteris S. striata – or unidentified comparable form
 †Sphenopteris striata
 †Spififer
 †Spififer bifurcatus
 †Spinocyrtia
  †Spirifer
 †Spirifer arizonensis
 †Spirifer bifurcata
 †Spirifer bifurcatus
 †Spirifer centronatus
 †Spirifer pellaensis
 †Spirifer rostellatus
 †Spirifer tenuicostatus
 †Spiriferellina
 †Spiriferellina hilli
  †Spiriferina
 †Spiriferina salemensis
 †Spiriferina spinosa
 †Squamularia – report made of unidentified related form or using admittedly obsolete nomenclature
 †Stegocoelia
 †Stegocoelia quadricostata – type locality for species
 †Stenodiscus – tentative report
 †Stenoscisma
 †Stenoscisma bisinuata
 †Stenoscisma explanata
    †Stigmaria
 †Stigmaria ficoides
 †Straparollus
 †Straparollus ophirensis
 †Streblopteria
 †Streblopteria simpliciformis
 †Streblotrypa
 †Streblotrypa nicklesi
 †Strianematina – type locality for genus
 †Strianematina pulchrelirata – type locality for species
 †Striatites
 †Striatosaccites
 †Stroboceras
 †Strophonelloides
 †Strophostylus
 †Strophostylus splendens
 †Supaia – type locality for genus
 †Supaia anomala – type locality for species
 †Supaia breviloba – type locality for species
 †Supaia compacta – type locality for species
 †Supaia linearifolia – type locality for species
 †Supaia merriami – type locality for species
 †Supaia rigida – type locality for species
 †Supaia sturdevantii – type locality for species
 †Supaia subgoepperti – type locality for species
 †Supaia thinnfeldioides – type locality for species
 †Synarmocrinus
 †Synarmocrinus carrizoensis – type locality for species
  †Syringopora
 †Syringospira
 †Syringospira prima

T

 †Tabulipora
 †Tabulipora paradisensis
 †Tabulipora tuberculata
 †Tabulophyllum
 †Taeniopteris
 †Taeniopteris angelica – type locality for species
 †Taeniopteris coriacea
 †Taeniopteris eckhardti – or unidentified comparable form
 †Taeniopteris newberriana
 †Taeniopteris T. newberriana – or unidentified comparable form
 †Tainoceras
 †Tainoceras duttoni
 †Tainoceras schellbachi – type locality for species
 †Taxites
 †Tenticospirifer
 †Tenticospirifer cyrtinaformis
 †Tenticospirifer cyrtinoformis
 †Tenticospirifer cytinoformis
 †Thamniscus
 †Thamniscus furcillatus
 †Thamnopora
 †Torynifer
 †Torynifer spinosus
 †Trapezophyllum
  †Triodus
 †Triodus elpia – type locality for species
 †Triplophyllum
 †Triquitrites
 †Tupus
 †Tupus gilmorei – type locality for species
 †Tupus whitei – type locality for species
 †Turbonopsis
 †Turbonopsis apachiensis
 †Tusayana – type locality for genus
 †Tusayana cibola – type locality for species

U

 †Ullmannia
 †Ullmannia frumentaria

V

 †Venustodus
 †Venustodus leidyi
 †Verrucosisporites
  †Vidria
 †Vidria contendens – type locality for species
 †Voltzia
 †Voltzia dentiloba – type locality for species

W

 †Waagenella
 †Waagenella crassus
 †Waagenoconcha
   †Walchia
 †Walchia dawsoni – type locality for species
 †Walchia gracillima – type locality for species
 †Walchia hypnoides
 †Walchia piniformis
 †Walpia
 †Walpia hermitensis – type locality for species
 †Wardia
 †Warthia
 †Warthia crassus
 †Wedekindellina
 †Wedekindellina matura – or unidentified comparable form
 †Wellerella
 †Wilkingia
 †Wilkingia terminale
 †Wilkingia terminalis
 †Worthenia
 †Worthenia arizonensis – type locality for species
 †Worthenia corrugata – type locality for species

Y

 †Yakia – type locality for genus
 †Yakia heterophylla – type locality for species
 †Yarravia
 †Yarravia gorelovii
 Yoldia

References
 

Paleozoic
Arizona
Arizona-related lists